Manguri Siding is located in the Adelaide–Darwin rail corridor at the locality of Mount Clarence Station, about  west of the opal mining town of Coober Pedy.

It was one of nine sidings to which names were assigned in 1978 in connection with the  Tarcoola to Alice Springs railway, which was completed in 1980.

, the weekly experiential tourism train, The Ghan, stops there for passengers to get off for a full-day excursion to Coober Pedy.

References

Railway stations in South Australia
Far North (South Australia)